Thomas or Tom Carson may refer to:

Thomas Carson (bishop) (1805–1874), Irish Anglican bishop
Thomas Carson (politician) (1911–?), Northern Irish politician
Tom Carson (footballer) (born 1959), Scottish footballer and coach
Tom Carson (golfer) (c. 1852–?), Scottish golfer
Tom Carson (field hockey) (born 1990), British field hockey player